The 2020 Colorado Springs Switchbacks FC season is the club's sixth year of existence, and their sixth season in the Western Conference of the USL Championship, the second tier of the United States soccer league system.

This was planned to be the team's final season at Weidner Field, the club's home since it started play in 2015. A new downtown stadium, also known as Weidner Field, is set to open for the 2021 season.

Players

Competitions

Exhibitions

USL Championship

Standings — Group C

Match results
On January 9, 2020, the USL announced the 2020 season schedule. In the preparations for the resumption of league play following the shutdown prompted by the COVID-19 pandemic, the remainder of the Switchbacks' schedule was announced on July 2.

U.S. Open Cup 

As a USL Championship club, the Switchbacks will enter the competition in the Second Round, to be played April 7–9.

References

2020
Colorado Springs Switchbacks
Colorado Springs
Colorado Springs